"Come into My Life" is a song written and recorded by Italian singer-songwriter Gala. It was released in November 1997 as the third single from her debut album, Come into My Life (1997). The song was produced by Filippo Andrea Carmeni and Maurizio Molella, and achieved success in Europe, South America, Russia and Middle East. It peaked at number-one in both Italy and Spain, and reached the top 10 also in Belgium, France and Greece.

Critical reception
American student newspaper Columbia Daily Spectator wrote that the song "sounds like ifs been ejected from a blender on high speed. The fashionably detached vocalist's singsong is more seductive than any gasping oh-baby could hope to be." A reviewer from Music Week stated that the "Italian diva" is back with a single, "in which a quirky intro moves into a funky chorus with a typically pedestrian vocal." In an retrospective review, Pop Rescue noted that "some acidy synths and a pumping beat usher" in the track, adding that Gala’s vocals here "continue their minimal wanderings."

Chart performance
"Come into My Life" was a major hit in several European countries, peaking at number-one in both Italy and Spain. It was also a top 10 hit in Belgium (4), France (10) and Greece (4), while entering the top 20 in Finland (11), as well as on the Eurochart Hot 100, where it hit number 20 in December 1997. In the United Kingdom, "Come into My Life" only reached number 38 on the UK Singles Chart, but it peaked at number 12 on the UK Dance Singles Chart, and number two on the UK Indie Chart. The single received a gold record in France, after 250,000 units were sold.

Music video
A music video was produced to promote the single, directed by Italian director Pietro Falini. It was later published on YouTube in October 2013, and as of February 2023, the video had generated more than 7.6 million views.

Track listings
 12" single
 "Come Into My Life" (Mix) - 06:14 	
 "Come Into My Life" (Club) - 05:05 	
 "Come Into My Life" (Edit) - 03:22

 CD single
 "Come Into My Life" (Edit Mix) - 3:22
 "Come Into My Life" (Mix) - 3:22

 CD maxi
 "Come Into My Life" (Edit Mix) - 3:25 	
 "Come Into My Life" (Edit) - 3:26 	
 "Come Into My Life" (Club Mix) - 5:11 	
 "Come Into My Life" (Mix) - 5:19

Charts

Weekly charts

Year-end charts

Certifications

References

1997 singles
Gala (singer) songs
Number-one singles in Italy
Number-one singles in Spain
1996 songs
ZYX Music singles
House music songs